

Events

Pre-1600
 561 – Following the death of King Chlothar I at Compiègne, his four sons, Charibert I, Guntram, Sigebert I and Chilperic I, divide the Frankish Kingdom.
 618 – The Tang dynasty scores a decisive victory over their rival Xue Rengao at the Battle of Qianshuiyuan.
 903 – The Abbasid army under Muhammad ibn Sulayman al-Katib defeats the Qarmatians at the Battle of Hama.
1114 – A large earthquake damages the areas of the Crusaders in the Middle East. Antioch, Mamistra, Marash and Edessa are hit by the shocks.
1549 – The papal conclave of 1549–50 begins.

1601–1900
1612 – The Battle of Swally takes place, which loosens the Portuguese Empire's hold on India.
1729 – Natchez Indians massacre 138 Frenchmen, 35 French women, and 56 children at Fort Rosalie, near the site of modern-day Natchez, Mississippi.
1732 – The magnitude 6.6 Irpinia earthquake causes  deaths in the former Kingdom of Naples, southern Italy.
1776 – During the American Revolutionary War, the Battle of Fort Cumberland, Nova Scotia, comes to an end with the arrival of British reinforcements.
1777 – San Jose, California, is founded as Pueblo de San José de Guadalupe by José Joaquín Moraga. It is the first civilian settlement, or pueblo, in Alta California.
1781 – The crew of the British slave ship Zong murders 54 Africans by dumping them into the sea to claim insurance, beginning the Zong massacre.
1783 – A 5.3 magnitude earthquake strikes New Jersey.
1807 – John VI of Portugal flees Lisbon from advancing Napoleonic forces during the Peninsular War, transferring the Portuguese court to Brazil.
1830 – An armed rebellion against Russia's rule in Poland begins.
1847 – The Sonderbund is defeated by the joint forces of other Swiss cantons under General Guillaume-Henri Dufour.
  1847   – Missionaries Dr. Marcus Whitman, his wife Narcissa, and 15 others are killed by Cayuse and Umatilla Indians, causing the Cayuse War.
1850 – The treaty, Punctation of Olmütz, is signed in Olomouc. Prussia capitulates to Austria, which will take over the leadership of the German Confederation.
1863 – Union forces under Ambrose Burnside successfully defend Knoxville, Tennessee from Confederate forces under James Longstreet in the Battle of Fort Sanders in the American Civil War.
1864 – Colorado volunteers led by Colonel John Chivington massacre at least 150 Cheyenne and Arapaho noncombatants inside Colorado Territory.
  1864   – The Confederate Army of Tennessee misses an opportunity to crush the Army of the Ohio in the Battle of Spring Hill.
1872 – The Modoc War begins with the Battle of Lost River.
1877 – Thomas Edison demonstrates his phonograph for the first time.
1890 – The Meiji Constitution goes into effect in Japan, and the first Diet convenes.
1899 – FC Barcelona is founded by Catalan, Spanish and Englishmen.  It later develops into one of Spanish football's most iconic and strongest teams.

1901–present
1929 – U.S. Admiral Richard E. Byrd leads the first expedition to fly over the South Pole.
1943 – The second session of the Anti-Fascist Council for the National Liberation of Yugoslavia (AVNOJ), held to determine the post-war ordering of the country, concludes in Jajce (present-day Bosnia and Herzegovina).
1944 – Albania is liberated by the Partisans.
1945 – The Federal People's Republic of Yugoslavia is declared.
1947 – The United Nations General Assembly approves a plan for the partition of Palestine.
  1947   – French forces carry out a massacre at Mỹ Trạch, Vietnam during the First Indochina War.
1952 – U.S. President-elect Dwight D. Eisenhower fulfills a campaign promise by traveling to Korea to find out what can be done to end the conflict.
1961 – Enos, a chimpanzee, is launched into space. The spacecraft orbits the Earth twice and splashes down off the coast of Puerto Rico.
1963 – U.S. President Lyndon B. Johnson establishes the Warren Commission to investigate the assassination of President John F. Kennedy.
  1963   – Trans-Canada Air Lines Flight 831 crashes shortly after takeoff from Montreal-Dorval International Airport, killing all 118 people on board.
  1963   – "I Want to Hold Your Hand", recorded on October 17, 1963, is released by the Beatles in the United Kingdom.
1967 – U.S. Secretary of Defense Robert McNamara announces his resignation.
1972 – Atari releases Pong, the first commercially successful video game.
1986 – The Surinamese military attacks the village of Moiwana during the Suriname Guerrilla War, killing at least 39 civilians, mostly women and children.
1987 – North Korean agents plant a bomb on Korean Air Flight 858, which kills all 115 passengers and crew.
2007 – The Armed Forces of the Philippines lay siege to the Peninsula Manila after soldiers led by Senator Antonio Trillanes stage a mutiny.
2009 – Maurice Clemmons shoots and kills four police officers inside a coffee shop in Lakewood, Washington.

Births

Pre-1600
 826 – William of Septimania, Frankish nobleman (d. 850)
1310 – John de Mowbray, 3rd Baron Mowbray, English Baron (d. 1361)
1338 – Lionel of Antwerp, 1st Duke of Clarence, Belgian-English politician, Lord Lieutenant of Ireland (d. 1368)
1422 – Thomas Percy, 1st Baron Egremont, English Baron (d. 1460)
1463 – Andrea della Valle, Italian cardinal (d. 1534)
1528 – Anthony Browne, 1st Viscount Montagu, English politician (d. 1592)

1601–1900
1627 – John Ray, English biologist and botanist (d. 1705)
1690 – Christian August, Prince of Anhalt-Zerbst (d. 1747)
1705 – Michael Christian Festing, English violinist and composer (d. 1752)
1752 – The Public Universal Friend, American evangelist (d. 1819)
1762 – Pierre André Latreille, French zoologist (d. 1833)
1781 – Andrés Bello, Venezuelan poet and philosopher (d. 1865)
1797 – Gaetano Donizetti, Italian composer (d. 1848)
1798 – Alexander Brullov, Russian painter and architect, designed the Pulkovo Observatory (d. 1877)
  1798   – Hamilton Rowan Gamble, American jurist and politician (d. 1864)
1799 – Amos Bronson Alcott, American philosopher and academic (d. 1888)
1802 – Wilhelm Hauff, German poet and author (d. 1827)
1803 – Christian Doppler, Austrian mathematician and physicist (d. 1853)
  1803   – Gottfried Semper, German architect and academic, designed the Semper Opera House (d. 1879)
1816 – Morrison Waite, American jurist and politician, 7th Chief Justice of the United States (d. 1888)
1817 – William Ellery Channing, American poet and author (d. 1901)
1818 – George Brown, Scottish-Canadian journalist and politician, 10th Premier of West Canada (d. 1880)
1823 – La Fayette Grover, American lawyer and politician, 4th Governor of Oregon (d. 1911)
1825 – Jean-Martin Charcot, French neurologist and psychologist (d. 1893)
1827 – William Crichton, Scottish engineer and shipbuilder (d. 1889)
1831 – Frederick Townsend Ward, American sailor and soldier (d. 1862)
1832 – Louisa May Alcott, American novelist and poet (d. 1888)
1835 – Empress Dowager Cixi of China (d. 1908)
1843 – Gertrude Jekyll, British horticulturist and writer (d. 1932)
1849 – John Ambrose Fleming, English physicist and engineer (d. 1945)
1856 – Theobald von Bethmann Hollweg, German lawyer and politician, 5th Chancellor of Germany (d. 1921)
1857 – Theodor Escherich, German-Austrian pediatrician and academic (d. 1911)
1861 – Spyridon Samaras, Greek composer (d. 1917)
1873 – Suzan Rose Benedict, American mathematician and academic (d. 1942)
1874 – Francis Dodd, Welsh-English painter and academic (d. 1949)
  1874   – Egas Moniz, Portuguese physician and neurologist, Nobel Prize laureate (d. 1955)
1876 – Nellie Tayloe Ross, American educator and politician, 14th Governor of Wyoming (d. 1977)
1879 – Jacob Gade, Danish violinist and composer (d. 1963)
1881 – Artur Phleps, Romanian-German general (d. 1944)
1882 – Henri Fabre, French pilot and engineer (d. 1984)
1891 – Julius Raab, Austrian engineer and politician, 19th Chancellor of Austria (d. 1964)
1895 – Busby Berkeley, American director and choreographer (d. 1976)
  1895   – William Tubman, Liberian lawyer and politician, 19th President of Liberia (d. 1971)
1898 – C. S. Lewis, British novelist, poet, and critic (d. 1963)
1899 – Andrija Artuković, Croatian Minister of Interior (d. 1988)
  1899   – Emma Morano, Italian supercentenarian, oldest Italian person ever (d. 2017)
1900 – Mildred Gillars, American broadcaster, employed by Nazi Germany to disseminate propaganda during WWII (d. 1988)

1901–present
1904 – Margaret Barr, Australian choreographer and teacher of dance-drama (d. 1991)
1905 – Marcel Lefebvre, French-Swiss archbishop and theologian (d. 1991)
1906 – Barbara C. Freeman, English writer and poet (b. 1999)
1908 – Adam Clayton Powell, Jr., American pastor and politician (d. 1972)
1910 – Elizabeth Choy, Malaysian-Singaporean educator and politician (d. 2006)
  1910   – Antanas Škėma, Lithuanian actor and director (d. 1961)
1915 – Ludu Daw Amar, Burmese journalist and author (d. 2008)
  1915   – Billy Strayhorn, American pianist and composer (d. 1967)
1916 – Fran Ryan, American actress and comedian (d. 2000)
1917 – Pierre Gaspard-Huit, French director and screenwriter (d. 2017)
  1917   – Merle Travis, American singer-songwriter and guitarist (d. 1983)
1918 – Madeleine L'Engle, American author and poet (d. 2007)
1919 – Joe Weider, Canadian-American bodybuilder and publisher, co-founded the IFBB (d. 2013)
1920 – Yegor Ligachyov, Russian engineer and politician (d. 2021)
  1920   – Joseph Shivers, American chemist and academic, developed spandex (d. 2014)
1921 – Jackie Stallone, American astrologer and a promoter of women's wrestling (d. 2020)
1922 – Michael Howard, English-American historian, author, and academic (d. 2019)
1923 – Chuck Daigh, American race car driver (b. 2008)
1925 – Minnie Miñoso, Cuban-American baseball player and coach (d. 2015)
1926 – Beji Caid Essebsi, Tunisian lawyer and politician, President of Tunisia (d. 2019)
1927 – Vin Scully, American sportscaster and game show host (d. 2022)
1928 – Tahir Salahov, Azerbaijani painter and educator (d. 2021)
  1928   – Paul Simon, American soldier and politician, 39th Lieutenant Governor of Illinois (d. 2003)
1929 – Derek Jameson, English journalist and radio host (d. 2012)
  1929   – Woo Yong-gak, North Korean soldier (d. 2012)
1930 – Shirley Porter, English politician, Lord Mayor of Westminster
  1930   – Vladimir Šenauer, Croatian footballer (d. 2013)
  1930   – Alan Lee Williams, English academic and politician
1931 – Shintaro Katsu, Japanese actor, singer, director, and producer (d. 1997)
1932 – Ed Bickert, Canadian jazz guitarist (d. 2019)
  1932   – Jacques Chirac, French soldier and politician, 22nd President of France (d. 2019)
  1932   – John Gary, American singer and television host (d. 1998)
1933 – John Mayall, English singer-songwriter, guitarist, and producer
  1933   – James Rosenquist, American painter and illustrator (d. 2017)
1934 – Willie Morris, American writer (d. 1999)
1935 – Diane Ladd, American actress
  1935   – Thomas J. O'Brien, American bishop (d. 2018)
1936 – Gregory Gillespie, American painter (d. 2000)
  1936   – Bill Jenkins, American politician
1937 – Eric Barnes, English footballer (d. 2014)
1938 – Johnny Crossan, Northern Irish footballer, author and sports analyst
1939 – Peter Bergman, American comedian, actor and screenwriter (d. 2012)
  1939   – Meco, American record producer and musician
1940 – Oscar Espinosa Chepe, Cuban-Spanish economist and journalist (d. 2013)
  1940   – Chuck Mangione, American horn player and composer
  1940   – Janet Smith, English lawyer and judge
  1940   – Henry T. Yang, Taiwanese/Chinese-American engineer and academic
1941 – Bill Freehan, American baseball player, coach, and sportscaster (d. 2021)
1942 – Michael Craze, British actor (d. 1998)
  1942   – Ann Dunham, American anthropologist and academic (d. 1995)
  1942   – John Grillo, English actor and playwright
1943 – Bobbi Martin, American singer-songwriter and guitarist (d. 2000)
  1943   – Sue Miller, American novelist and short story writer
1944 – Felix Cavaliere, American singer-songwriter, pianist, and producer
1945 – Csaba Pléh, Hungarian psychologist and linguist
1946 – Suzy Chaffee, American skier
  1946   – Silvio Rodríguez, Cuban singer-songwriter and guitarist
1947 – Petra Kelly, German activist and politician (d. 1992)
  1947   – Ronnie Montrose, American singer-songwriter, guitarist, and producer (d. 2012)
1948 – Yōichi Masuzoe, Japanese politician
1949 – Jerry Lawler, American wrestler and sportscaster
  1949   – Garry Shandling, American comedian, actor, and screenwriter (d. 2016)
  1949   – Steve Smith, American lawyer and politician (d. 2014)
1950 – Marie Laberge, Canadian actress, educator and writer
  1950   – Kevin O'Donnell, Jr., American author (d. 2012)
1951 – Barry Goudreau, American guitarist and songwriter
  1951   – Roger Troutman, American singer-songwriter and producer (d. 1999)
1952 – John D. Barrow, English cosmologist, theoretical physicist, and mathematician (d. 2020)
  1952   – Jeff Fahey, American actor and producer
1953 – Alex Grey, American visual artist and author
  1953   – Vlado Kreslin, Slovenian singer-songwriter
  1953   – Christine Pascal, French actress, writer and director (d. 1996)
1954 – Joel Coen, American director, producer, and screenwriter
  1954   – Chirlane McCray, American writer, editor, and activist
1955 – Howie Mandel, Canadian comedian, actor, and television host
  1955   – Hassan Sheikh Mohamud, Somali politician, 8th president of Somalia
1956 – Hinton Battle, German-American actor, dancer, and choreographer
  1956   – Yvonne Fovargue, English lawyer and politician
1957 – Janet Napolitano, American politician, lawyer, and university administrator
  1957   – Jean-Philippe Toussaint, Belgian novelist, photographer and filmmaker
1958 – Michael Dempsey, Zimbabwean-English bass player
  1958   – John Dramani Mahama, Ghanaian historian and politician, 4th President of Ghana 
1959 – Richard Borcherds, South African-English mathematician and academic
  1959   – Neal Broten, American ice hockey player
  1959   – Rahm Emanuel, American businessman and politician, 55th Mayor of Chicago
1960 – Marco Bucci, Italian discus thrower (d. 2013)
  1960   – Cathy Moriarty, American actress
1962 – Ronny Jordan, English singer-songwriter and guitarist (d. 2014)
  1962   – Andrew McCarthy, American actor and director
1963 – Will Downing, American singer-songwriter and producer
  1963   – Lalit Modi, Indian businessman
1964 – Don Cheadle, American actor and producer
  1964   – Ken Monkou, Dutch footballer
1965 – Lauren Child, English author
  1965   – Ellen Cleghorne, American comedian and actress
1966 – Dru Pagliassotti, American author
  1966   – Sophia Rosenfeld, American author
1967 – Fernando Ramos da Silva, Brazilian actor (d. 1987)
  1967   – Rebecca Wolff, American author and poet
1968 – Andy Melville, Welsh footballer
  1968   – Iolanda Nanni, Italian politician (d. 2018)
1969 – Tomas Brolin, Swedish footballer
  1969   – Mariano Rivera, Panamanian-American baseball player
1970 – Larry Joe Campbell, American actor and director
  1970   – Mark Pembridge, Welsh footballer and coach
1971 – David E. Campbell, Canadian political scientist
  1971   – Steve May, American soldier and politician
  1971   – Gena Lee Nolin, American actress and model
1972 – Brian Baumgartner, American actor and producer
  1972   – Jamal Mashburn, American basketball player and sportscaster
1973 – Ryan Giggs, Welsh footballer and manager
1974 – Pavol Demitra, Slovak ice hockey player (d. 2011)
  1974   – Sarah Jones, American actress and playwright
  1974   – Jedediah Purdy, American legal scholar and cultural commentator
1975 – Craig Ireland, Scottish footballer
  1975   – Scott McCulloch, Scottish footballer
1976 – Chadwick Boseman, American actor and playwright (d. 2020)
  1976   – Anna Faris, American actress
1977 – Andy Beshear, American attorney and politician, 63rd governor of Kentucky
  1977   – Maria Petrova, Russian figure skater
1978 – Lauren German, American actress
  1978   – Dimitrios Konstantopoulos, Greek footballer
1979 – Adam Barrett, English footballer
  1979   – The Game, American rapper
1980 – Janina Gavankar, American actress and singer
  1980   – Dean Howell, English footballer
1981 – Fawad Khan, Pakistani actor, model and singer
  1981   – Jon Klassen, Canadian writer and illustrator
1982 – Lucas Black, American film and television actor
  1982   – Gemma Chan, English actress
1983 – Franchesca Ramsey, American comedian
  1983   – Aylin Tezel, German actress
1985 – Shannon Brown, American basketball player
  1985   – Dominic Roma, English footballer
1986 – Asa Hall, English footballer
1988 – Bradley Hudson-Odoi, Ghanaian footballer
  1988   – Russell Wilson, American football player
1989 – Adam Chapman, Northern Irish footballer
1990 – Diego Boneta, Mexican actor and singer
  1990   – Yacouba Sylla, French footballer
1991 – Becky James, Welsh cyclist
1992 – Ben Nugent, English footballer
1993 – Stefon Diggs, American football player
1994 – Shaun Lane, Australian rugby league player
 1994    – Julius Randle, American basketball player
1995 – Laura Marano, American actress and singer
  1995   – Siobhan-Marie O'Connor, English swimmer
1998 – Ye Qiuyu, Chinese tennis player
2002 – Yunus Musah, American soccer player

Deaths

Pre-1600
 521 – Jacob of Serugh, Syrian poet and theologian (b. 451)
 524 – Ahkal Mo' Naab' I, ruler of Palenque (b. 465)
 561 – Chlothar I, Frankish king (b. 497)
 835 – Muhammad al-Jawad, the ninth of the Twelve Imams (b. 811)
1253 – Otto II, duke of Bavaria (b. 1206)
1268 – Clement IV, pope of the Catholic Church (b. 1190)
1314 – Philip IV, king of France (b. 1268)
1330 – Roger Mortimer, 1st Earl of March, English soldier and politician, Lord Lieutenant of Ireland (b. 1287)
1342 – Michael of Cesena, Italian general, priest, and theologian (b. 1270)
1378 – Charles IV, Holy Roman Emperor (b. 1316)
1530 – Thomas Wolsey, English cardinal and politician, Lord Chancellor of the United Kingdom (b. 1473)
1577 – Cuthbert Mayne, English priest (b. 1543)
1590 – Philipp Nicodemus Frischlin, German philologist and poet (b. 1547)
1594 – Alonso de Ercilla, Spanish soldier and poet (b. 1533)

1601–1900
1626 – Ernst von Mansfeld, German commander (b. 1580)
1628 – John Felton, English soldier and assassin of the Duke of Buckingham (b. c. 1595)
1632 – Frederick V, Elector Palatine (b. 1596)
1643 – William Cartwright, English priest and playwright (b. 1611)
  1643   – Claudio Monteverdi, Italian priest and composer (b. 1567)
1646 – Laurentius Paulinus Gothus, Swedish astronomer and theologian (b. 1565)
1661 – Brian Walton, English bishop and scholar (b. 1600)
1695 – James Dalrymple, 1st Viscount of Stair, Scottish lawyer and politician, Lord President of the Court of Session (b. 1619)
1699 – Patrick Gordon, Scottish-Russian general (b. 1635)
1759 – Nicolaus I Bernoulli, Swiss mathematician and theorist (b. 1687)
1780 – Maria Theresa, Holy Roman Empress, wife of Francis I, Holy Roman Emperor (b. 1717)
1797 – Samuel Langdon, American pastor, theologian, and academic (b. 1723)
1830 – Charles-Simon Catel, French composer and educator (b. 1773)
1846 – Hammamizade İsmail Dede Efendi, Turkish composer and educator (b. 1778)
1847 – Marcus Whitman, American physician and missionary (b. 1802)
1872 – Mary Somerville, Scottish-Italian astronomer, mathematician, and author (b. 1780)
1894 – Juan N. Méndez, Mexican general and interim president, 1876-1877 (b. 1820)

1901–present
1901 – Francesc Pi i Margall, Spanish federalist and republican politician and theorist (b. 1824)
1918 – Prince Antônio Gastão of Orléans-Braganza, Brazilian prince (b. 1881)
1924 – Giacomo Puccini, Italian composer and educator (b. 1858)
1927 – George Giffen, Australian cricketer (b. 1859)
1932 – Abdullah Cevdet, Kurdish-Turkish physician and academic (b. 1869)
1939 – Philipp Scheidemann, German lawyer and politician, 10th Chancellor of Germany (b. 1865)
1941 – Frank Waller, American sprinter and hurdler (b. 1884)
1942 – Boyd Wagner, American colonel and pilot (b. 1916)
1942 – Ron Middleton (VC), Australian bomber pilot and Victoria Cross Recipient (b. 1916) 
1950 – Walter Beech, American aviator and early aviation entrepreneur (b. 1891)
1953 – Sam De Grasse, Canadian-American actor (b. 1875)
1954 – Dink Johnson, American pianist, clarinet player, and drummer (b. 1892)
1957 – Erich Wolfgang Korngold, Czech-American pianist and composer (b. 1897)
1967 – Ferenc Münnich, Hungarian soldier and politician, 47th Prime Minister of Hungary (b. 1886)
1970 – Robert T. Frederick, American general (b. 1907)
1972 – Carl Stalling, American pianist and composer (b. 1888)
1974 – Peng Dehuai, Chinese Communist military leader (b. 1898)
1975 – Graham Hill plane crash
                Tony Brise, English race car driver (b. 1952)
                Graham Hill, English race car driver and businessman (b. 1929)
1980 – Dorothy Day, American journalist and activist, co-founded the Catholic Worker Movement (b. 1897)
1981 – Natalie Wood, American actress (b. 1938)
1982 – Percy Williams, Canadian sprinter (b. 1908)
1984 – Nora Thompson Dean, American Lenape educator and author (b. 1907) 
1986 – Cary Grant, English-American actor (b. 1904)
1987 – Irene Handl, English actress (b. 1901)
1991 – Ralph Bellamy, American actor (b. 1904)
  1991   – Joe Bonson, English footballer (b. 1936)
1992 – Jean Dieudonné, French mathematician and academic (b. 1906)
1993 – J. R. D. Tata, French-Indian pilot and businessman, founded Tata Motors and Tata Global Beverages (b. 1904)
1996 – Dan Flavin, American sculptor and illustrator (b. 1933)
  1996   – Denis Jenkinson, English journalist and author (b. 1920)
1997 – Coleman Young, American politician, 66th Mayor of Detroit (b. 1918)
1998 – George Van Eps American swing and mainstream jazz guitarist (b. 1913)
  1998   – Robin Ray, English broadcaster, actor, and musician (b. 1934)
1999 – Germán Arciniegas, Colombian historian, author and journalist (b. 1900)
  1999   – John Berry, American-French actor, director, and screenwriter (b. 1917)
  1999   – Gene Rayburn, American game show panelist and host (b. 1917)
  1999   – Kazuo Sakamaki, Japanese soldier (b. 1918)
2000 – Ilmar Laaban, Estonian-Swedish poet and publicist (b. 1921)
2001 – Mic Christopher, American-Irish singer-songwriter and guitarist (b. 1969)
  2001   – George Harrison, English singer-songwriter, guitarist, and music producer (b. 1943)
  2001   – John Knowles, American novelist (b. 1926)
2002 – Daniel Gélin, French actor, director, and screenwriter (b. 1921)
2003 – Rudi Martinus van Dijk, Dutch composer (b. 1932)
2004 – John Drew Barrymore, American actor (b. 1932)
  2004   – Harry Danning, American baseball player and coach (b. 1911)
  2004   – Jack Shields, Canadian member of Parliament (b. 1929)
2005 – David Di Tommaso, French footballer (b. 1979)
2006 – Allen Carr, English-Spanish accountant and author (b. 1934)
  2006   – Ernie Tagg, English footballer (b. 1917)
2007 – James Barber, Canadian chef and author (b. 1923)
  2007   – Ralph Beard, American basketball player (b. 1927)
  2007   – Henry Hyde, American lawyer and politician (b. 1924)
2008 – Jørn Utzon, Danish architect, designed the Sydney Opera House (b. 1918)
2009 – Robert Holdstock, English author (b. 1948)
  2009   – Zuhair Al-Karmi, Palestinian author, scientific programs presenter on TV (b. 1922).
2010 – Bella Akhmadulina, Russian poet and author (b. 1937)
  2010   – Mario Monicelli, Italian director and screenwriter (b. 1915)
  2010   – S. Sivanayagam, Sri Lankan journalist and author (b. 1930)
  2010   – Stephen J. Solarz, American academic and politician (b. 1940)
  2010   – Maurice Wilkes, English physicist and computer scientist (b. 1913)
2011 – Patrice O'Neal, American stand-up comedian (b. 1969)
  2011   – Guillermo O'Donnell, Argentine political scientist (b. 1936)
2012 – Joelmir Beting, Brazilian journalist (b. 1936)
  2012   – Sherab Palden Beru, Tibetan painter (b. 1911)
2013 – Oliver Cheatham, American singer-songwriter (b. 1948)
  2013   – Colin Eglin, South African soldier and politician (b. 1925)
  2013   – Natalya Gorbanevskaya, Russian-Polish poet and activist (b. 1936)
  2013   – Brian Torrey Scott, American playwright and screenwriter (b. 1976)
2014 – Dwayne Alons, American general and politician (b. 1946)
  2014   – Dick Bresciani, American businessman (b. 1938)
  2014   – Mark Strand, Canadian-born American poet, essayist, and translator (b. 1934)
2015 – Joseph F. Girzone, American Catholic priest and author (b. 1930)
  2015   – Joe Marston, Australian footballer and manager (b. 1926)
  2015   – Christopher Middleton, British poet and translator (b. 1926)
  2015   – O'tkir Sultonov, Uzbek lawyer and politician, 2nd Prime Minister of Uzbekistan (b. 1939)
2016 – Luis Alberto Monge, Costa Rican politician, 39th President of Costa Rica (b. 1925)
  2016   – Marcos Danilo Padilha, Brazilian football player (b. 1985)
  2016   – Ruta Šaca-Marjaša, Latvian lawyer, writer and politician (b. 1927)
2017 – Slobodan Praljak, Croatian general (b. 1945)
2019 – Yasuhiro Nakasone, Japanese politician, 45th Prime Minister of Japan (b. 1918)
2020 – Papa Bouba Diop, Senegalese footballer (b. 1978)
2021 – Kinza Clodumar, Nauruan politician, 7th President of Nauru (b. 1945)
  2021   – Arlene Dahl, American actress, businesswoman and writer (b. 1925)
  2021   – LaMarr Hoyt, Major League Baseball player, 1983 AL Cy Young Award winner (b. 1955)
2022 – Derek Granger, British film and television producer and screenwriter (b. 1921)
  2022   – Tapunuu Niko Lee Hang, Samoan politician (b. 1953/1954)

Holidays and observances
Christian feast day:
Brendan of Birr
Francis Fasani
Illuminata
Radboud of Utrecht
Saturnin
November 29 (Eastern Orthodox liturgics)
International Day of Solidarity with the Palestinian People (United Nations)
Liberation Day or Dita e Çlirimit (Albania)
Republic Day (Yugoslavia)
Unity Day (Vanuatu)
William Tubman's Birthday (Liberia)

References

External links

 
 
 

Days of the year
November